The 2016 FIBA Under-17 World Championship (Spanish: 2016 FIBA Campeonato Mundial Sub-17) was the 4th edition of the FIBA Under-17 World Championship, the biennial international men's youth basketball championship contested by the U17 national teams of the member associations of FIBA.

It was hosted by Zaragoza, Spain from 23 June to 3 July 2016. The United States won their fourth title in the competition after beating Turkey in the final, 96–56. USA extended their unbeaten streak in the U17 World Championship to 30–0.

Teams
Sixteen teams have qualified for this year's edition.

2015 FIBA Africa Under-16 Championship

2015 FIBA Asia Under-16 Championship

2015 FIBA Americas Under-16 Championship

2015 FIBA Europe Under-16 Championship 

2015 FIBA Oceania Under-16 Championship

Host country

Preliminary round
The draw was held on 13 April 2016.

All times are local (UTC+2).

Group A

Group B

Group C

Group D

Final round

Round of 16

9–16th classification playoffs

9–16th place quarterfinals

13–16th place semifinals

15th place game

13th place game

9–12th place semifinals

Eleventh place game

Ninth place game

Quarterfinals

5–8th classification

5–8th place semifinals

Seventh place game

Fifth place game

Semifinals

Third place game

Final

Final standings

Awards

All-Tournament Team
 Collin Sexton 
 Arnas Velička
 Džanan Musa
 Sergi Martínez
 Wendell Carter Jr.

Statistics

Points

Rebounds

Assists

Blocks

Steals

Efficiency

Notes

References

External links
Official website

2016
2016 in basketball
2015–16 in Spanish basketball
International youth basketball competitions hosted by Spain
Sport in Zaragoza
June 2016 sports events in Europe
July 2016 sports events in Europe
2016 in youth sport